Valencia-Joaquín Sorolla railway station is a railway station in Valencia, Spain, opened in 2010. Along with Estació del Nord, it is a city centre terminus station, primarily serving AVE high-speed rail services, with Estació del Nord serving all other passenger rail traffic.

History
The station was inaugurated in 2010 along with the high-speed railway from Madrid to Valencia. It was named after painter Joaquín Sorolla, who was born in the city.

Services 
Valencia-Joaquín Sorolla station primarily serves AVE trains to Madrid Atocha and Seville-Santa Justa via Requena-Utiel, with some continuing to Castelló de la Plana.

Alvia trains call at the station on the Oropesa del Mar to Gijón service, as do Euromed services between Alicante and Barcelona França. Intercity trains also operate from Madrid to Gandia via Joaquín Sorolla.

The nearest Metrovalencia station is Jesús.

Future
A new Valencia Central Station will be built that eventually replaces the existing Valencia North and Joaquín Sorolla stations. It will be 12 tracks wide in 2 subterranean levels.

References

Railway stations in the Valencian Community
Railway stations in Spain opened in 2010
Buildings and structures in Valencia
Rail transport in Valencia